Madepalle is a village in Eluru district of the Indian state of Andhra Pradesh. It is located in Eluru mandal of Eluru revenue division. The town is a constituent of Eluru urban agglomeration.

Demographics 

 Census of India, Madepalle had a population of 5132. The total population constitute, 2528 males and 2604 females with a sex ratio of 1030 females per 1000 males. 524 children are in the age group of 0–6 years with child sex ratio of 1130 girls per 1000 boys. The average literacy rate stands at 77.04 %

References

External links

Villages in Eluru district